The 31st César Awards ceremony, presented by the Académie des Arts et Techniques du Cinéma, honoured the best films of 2005 in France and took place on 25 February 2006 at the Théâtre du Châtelet in Paris. The ceremony was chaired by Carole Bouquet and hosted by Valérie Lemercier. The Beat That My Heart Skipped won the award for Best Film.

The ceremony was marred by demonstrations by the intermittents (film industry workers), who lobbied for greater rights for temporary contract workers after running onto the stage before the start. The police had to evacuate the protesters, which ultimately led to a 23-minute delay to the start of the proceedings.

Winners and nominees
The nominations were announced on 10 January 2006. Winners are highlighted in bold:

Viewers
The show was followed by 2.5 million viewers. This corresponds to 13.6% of the audience.

See also
 78th Academy Awards
 59th British Academy Film Awards
 18th European Film Awards
 11th Lumières Awards

References

External links

 Official website
 
 31st César Awards at AlloCiné

2006
Cesar Awards
Cesar Awards
Cesar Awards
Cesar Awards